The order of battle of the Serbian Army in the First Balkan War is a list of the Serbian units that fought the major campaigns against the Ottoman army from October 1912 to May 1913.

Apart from the infantry divisions of the Serbian army, one Bulgarian infantry division was also part of it.

Order of battle

First Army 

Under the command of Crown Prince Alexander Karađorđević.

Chief of Staff: Colonel Petar Bojović.

Second Army 

Commander: General Stepa Stepanović

Third Army 

Commander: General Božidar Janković

Army of Ibar 

Commander: General Mihailo Živković

Javor brigade 

Commander: Colonel Milivoje Anđelković

 III supernumerary infantry regiment ( I line )
 IV infantry regiment ( II line) - LtCol Vilotije Marković
 3rd battery ( detached from Drina divisional artillery division )
 4th mountain battery ( II line )
 1st Užice position battery
 6th heavy battery 120 mm
 cavalry squadron

See also 
 First Balkan war
 Kingdom of Serbia

Notes

A.In the Royal Serbian Army, artillery and cavalry divisions (divizion) were units of battalion size not to be confused with the higher level of divisions (divizija) which had geographic names; The Serbian Army was divided into five divisional area: Morava, Drina, Danube, Shumadia and Timok. Each of them was made of three regional regimental commands with four battalion districts each. Each divisional area provided one first-call division, one second-call division, one or two cavalry squadrons and 6 station batteries.

References

Literature

First Balkan War
 
Balkan Wars orders of battle
History of the Serbian Army
Royal Serbian Army
Military units and formations of Serbia in the Balkan Wars